William Worthington may refer to:

 William Worthington (actor) (1872–1941), American silent film actor and director
 William Worthington (priest) (1703–1778), Anglican priest and theological writer
 William Barton Worthington (1854–1939), British civil engineer
 William Grafton Delaney Worthington (1785–1856), American lawyer, judge, and politician
 William H. Worthington (1828–1862), American farmer, lawyer, and military officer
 William Jackson Worthington (1833–1914), American politician
 William Chesley Worthington (1903–2002), editor of The Providence Journal and editor of the Brown Alumni Monthly